Wimbush is a surname of English origin. People with that surname include:

 Brandon Wimbush (born 1996), American football player
 Derrick Wimbush (born 1980), American football player
 F. Blair Wimbush (born 1955), American railroad executive, lawyer and civic and professional leader
 Henry B Wimbush (1858–1943), English landscape painter, book illustrator and postcard artist
 John L. Wimbush (1854–1914), English landscape and portrait painter
 Martin Wimbush (born 1949), British actor
 Mary Wimbush (1924–2005), English actress
 Richard Wimbush (1903–1994), British Anglican priest

See also 
 Winbush (disambiguation)